This is a list of public parks in Dubai, United Arab Emirates.

Public parks
Al Barsha Pond Park, Al Barsha 2 
Al Mamzar Beach Park, Deira
Al Muteena Park, Al Muteena, Deira 
Al Nahda Pond Park, Al Nahda
Al Twar Park, Al Tawr
Creekside Park, Bur Dubai
Jumeirah Beach Park, Jumeirah Beach Road  
Mushrif Park, Al Khawanij
Safa Park, Sheikh Zayed Road
Zabeel Park, Sheikh Zayed Road
Al Qusais Pond Park, Al Qusais
Al Rashidiya Park

Theme parks

20th Century Fox World (Cancelled)
Aquaventure Water park, Atlantis, The Palm
Dubai Butterfly Garden, Al Barsha 3
Dubai Miracle Garden, Al Barsha 3 South
IMG Worlds of Adventure
Marvel Superheroes Theme Park (Cancelled)
Motiongate Dubai
Six Flags Dubai (Cancelled)
Wild Wadi Water Park, Jumeirah Beach Road
Jungle Bay Waterpark
Dubai Parks and Resorts
Bollywood Parks Dubai
LEGOLAND Dubai
LEGOLAND Water Park
Aventura Park
Zombie Apocalypse Park Dubai

See also
List of development projects in Dubai
List of hotels in Dubai
Tourist attractions in Dubai

References
List of parks in Dubai
List of Best Parks in Dubai

Dubai
United Arab Emirates geography-related lists
Lists of real estate in Dubai